It's Tricky (foaled February 26, 2008 in Kentucky - 2017) was an American  Thoroughbred racemare.
She was sired by Mineshaft, who also sired the Kentucky Derby contender, Dialed In.  She was out of the mare Catboat. Owned by Godolphin Racing LLC and trained by Kiaran McLaughlin, in 2011 she won the Busher Stakes, the Acorn Stakes and the Coaching Club American Oaks.

2010 season
On November 28, 2010, It's Tricky won her first race a 6 furlong maiden race. She was ridden by Alan Garcia.

2011 season

On January 26, 2011, It's Tricky won the 1 mile 70 yards long allowance race with Eddie Castro.

On February 20, 2011, It's Tricky won the Busher Stakes going 1 mile 70 yards with Eddie Castro. She won by 8 lengths as a favourite. She was perfect in three starts.

On April 2, 2011, It's Tricky finished 4th in the Gulfstream Park Oaks to R Heat Lightning. Her jockey was Alan Garcia.

On June 11, 2011, It's Tricky won the Acorn Stakes by 3 3/4 lengths over the favorite Turbulent Descent.

On July 23, 2011, It's Tricky won the Coaching Club American Oaks. She beat the strong field of Joyful Victory, Black-Eyed Susan Stakes winner Royal Delta, Mother Goose Stakes winner Buster's Ready and Kentucky Oaks winner Plum Pretty.

2012 season
On March 3, 2012, It's Tricky won the Grade II Top Flight Handicap at Aqueduct Racetrack under jockey Ramon Dominguez.

On April 14, 2012, It's Tricky won the Distaff Handicap as the favorite, and on May 28, 2012, she won the Ogden Phipps Handicap.

Retirement and death 
It's Tricky produced three foals as a broodmare. Her first foal, foaled in 2014, is a Medaglia d'Oro filly named Too Complicated, who never went into race training due to a physical issue and is now a broodmare. Her 2015 foal, Enticed, who is also by Medaglia d'Oro, won the Kentucky Jockey Club Stakes and Gotham Stakes and finished 14th in the 2018 Kentucky Derby. It's Tricky's 2016 foal by Ghostzapper, Enliven, is currently in race training.

It's Tricky died of complications of laminitis in 2017.

Career statistics

Pedigree

References

2008 racehorse births
2017 racehorse deaths
Racehorses bred in Kentucky
Racehorses trained in the United States
Thoroughbred family 8-g